is a Japanese professional golfer. He has won 17 tournaments on the Japan Golf Tour.

Professional career
Tanihara has won 14 tournaments on the Japan Golf Tour and featured in the top 50 of the Official World Golf Ranking. His highest ranking came in June 2017 when he reached 47th. He finished tied for fifth place in the 2006 Open Championship and reached the semi-finals of the 2017 WGC-Dell Technologies Match Play. His best finish outside of Japan was a second place finish at the 2016 New Zealand Open, an official event on the Australasian Tour. He has represented Japan four times in the World Cup.

Personal life
On 14 July 2008, it was announced that he and actress Ayaka Nagate had married.

Professional wins (18)

Japan Golf Tour wins (17)

*Note: Tournament shortened to 54 holes due to weather.
1Co-sanctioned by the Asian Tour

Japan Golf Tour playoff record (2–2)

Japan Challenge Tour wins (1)

Results in major championships

CUT = missed the half-way cut
"T" = tied for place

Summary

Most consecutive cuts made – 2 (2006 Open Championship – 2006 PGA)
Longest streak of top-10s – 1

Results in World Golf Championships
Results not in chronological order prior to 2015.

QF, R16, R32, R64 = Round in which player lost in match play
"T" = tied
Note that the HSBC Champions did not become a WGC event until 2009.

Team appearances
Amateur
Bonallack Trophy (representing Asia/Pacific): 2000

Professional
World Cup (representing Japan): 2006, 2007, 2013, 2018
Royal Trophy (representing Asia): 2009 (winners)
EurAsia Cup (representing Asia): 2014, 2018
Amata Friendship Cup (representing Japan): 2018

See also
2004 PGA Tour Qualifying School graduates
List of golfers with most Japan Golf Tour wins

References

External links

Japanese male golfers
Japan Golf Tour golfers
LIV Golf players
Asian Games medalists in golf
Asian Games gold medalists for Japan
Golfers at the 1998 Asian Games
Medalists at the 1998 Asian Games
People from Onomichi, Hiroshima
Sportspeople from Hiroshima Prefecture
1978 births
Living people